ʽAmran is one of the governorates of Yemen.

Geography

Adjacent governorates

 Saada Governorate (north)
 Al Jawf Governorate (east)
 Sanaa Governorate (southeast)
 Al Mahwit Governorate (south)
 Hajjah Governorate (west)

Districts
'Amran Governorate is divided into the following 20 districts. These districts are further divided into sub-districts, and then further subdivided into villages:

 Al Ashah District
 Al Madan District
 Al Qaflah District
 Amran District
 As Sawd District
 As Sudah District
 Bani Suraim District
 Dhi Bin District
 Habur Zulaymah District
 Harf Sufyan District
 Huth District
 Iyal Surayh District
 Jabal Iyal Yazid District
 Khamir District
 Kharif District
 Maswar District
 Raydah District
 Shaharah District
 Suwayr District
 Thula District

References

 
Governorates of Yemen

Amran Governorate